View from a Backstage Pass is a live compilation by The Who. This double album was released on 5 November 2007, available only to new subscribers of The Who.com.

Track listing
All songs written by Pete Townshend except where noted.

Disc one
"Fortune Teller" (Allen Toussaint) – Recorded at the Grande Ballroom, Detroit, Michigan, 12 October 1969
"Happy Jack" – Recorded at City Hall, Hull, 15 February 1970 – 2:12
"I'm a Boy" – Recorded at City Hall, Hull, 15 February 1970 – 2:46
"A Quick One, While He's Away" – Recorded at City Hall, Hull, 15 February 1970 – 8:53
"Magic Bus" – Recorded at an unknown venue in 1971 (mislabelled as occurring at Mammoth Gardens, Denver, Colorado, 9 June 1970) – 13:50
"I Can't Explain" – Recorded at Civic Auditorium, San Francisco, California, 13 December 1971 – 2:38
"Substitute" – Recorded at Civic Auditorium, San Francisco, California, 13 December 1971 – 2:18
"My Wife" (John Entwistle) – Recorded at Civic Auditorium, San Francisco, California, 13 December 1971 – 7:06
"Behind Blue Eyes" – Recorded at Civic Auditorium, San Francisco, California, 13 December 1971 – 4:36
"Bargain" – Recorded at Civic Auditorium, San Francisco, California, 13 December 1971 – 6:41
"Baby Don't You Do It" (Holland-Dozier-Holland) – Recorded at Civic Auditorium, San Francisco, California, 13 December 1971 – 6:17

Disc two
"The Punk and the Godfather" – Recorded at The Spectrum, Philadelphia, Pennsylvania 4 December 1973 – 4:52 (mislabelled as occurring at The Capital Centre, Largo, MD)
"5:15" – Recorded at Recorded at The Spectrum, Philadelphia, Pennsylvania 4 December 1973 – 6:02 (mislabelled as occurring at The Capital Centre, Largo, MD)
"Won't Get Fooled Again" – Recorded at The Spectrum, Philadelphia, Pennsylvania 4 December 1973 – 8:53 (mislabelled as occurring at The Capital Centre, Largo, MD)
"Young Man Blues" (Mose Allison) – Recorded at Charlton Athletic Football Club, South London,18 May 1974 – 5:57
"Tattoo" – Recorded at Charlton Athletic Football Club, South London,18 May 1974 – 3:21
"Boris The Spider" (John Entwistle) – Recorded at Charlton Athletic Football Club, South London,18 May 1974 – 3:14
"Naked Eye/"Let's See Action"/"My Generation Blues" – Recorded at Charlton Athletic Football Club, South London,18 May 1974 – 14:40
"Squeeze Box" – Recorded at Vetch Field, Swansea, Wales, 12 June 1976 – 3:17
"Dreaming from the Waist" – Recorded at Vetch Field, Swansea, Wales, 12 June 1976 – 4:54
"Fiddle About" (John Entwistle) – Recorded at Vetch Field, Swansea, Wales, 12 June 1976 – 1:45
"Pinball Wizard" – Recorded at Vetch Field, Swansea, Wales, 12 June 1976 – 2:48
"I'm Free" – Recorded at Vetch Field, Swansea, Wales, 12 June 1976 – 2:17
"Tommy's Holiday Camp" (Keith Moon) – Recorded at Vetch Field, Swansea, Wales, 12 June 1976 – 0:51
"We're Not Gonna Take It" – Recorded at Vetch Field, Swansea, Wales, 12 June 1976 – 3:32
"See Me, Feel Me/Listening To You" – Recorded at Vetch Field, Swansea, Wales, 12 June 1976 – 4:59

Personnel
The Who 
Pete Townshend – lead guitar, vocals
Roger Daltrey – lead vocals, harmonica
John Entwistle – bass guitars, vocals
Keith Moon – drums, percussion, vocals

Production
Produced by Bob Pridden
Compiled and mastered by Jon Astley
Mixed by Bob Pridden and Sean Witt

Design
 Cover design by Richard Evans

References

The Who live albums
Self-released albums
2007 live albums